Oon or OON may refer to:

 Oon Brothers, Malaysian badminton players
 Oon Yung, North Korean diplomat
  (OÖN), an Austrian newspaper
 Önge language, a language of the Andaman Islands
 Order of Orange-Nassau
 Officer of the Order of the Niger
 Oon, a Chinese surname